Kjellberg Peak is a small rock peak at the head of Frostlendet Valley, about  west of Ryvingen Peak, in the southern part of the Borg Massif of Queen Maud Land, Antarctica. It was mapped by Norwegian cartographers from surveys and air photos by the Norwegian–British–Swedish Antarctic Expedition (1949–52) and named for Sigvard Kjellberg, a photographer with the Norwegian air unit of the expedition.

References

Mountains of Queen Maud Land
Princess Martha Coast